Stenonema is a genus of mayflies in the family Heptageniidae.

References

Mayfly genera
Insects of Europe
Mayflies